Saim Koca (born 1 January 1966) is a Turkish cross-country skier. He competed in the men's 15 kilometre classical event at the 1988 Winter Olympics.

References

External links
 

1966 births
Living people
Turkish male cross-country skiers
Olympic cross-country skiers of Turkey
Cross-country skiers at the 1988 Winter Olympics
People from Sarıkamış
20th-century Turkish people